Girton High School is a private school for girls in Mumbai, Maharashtra, India. It was established in 1888.

Notable alumni 
 Gulestan Rustom Billimoria, philanthropist, social worker, writer and painter

References

External links 
 

High schools and secondary schools in Mumbai
Private schools in Mumbai
Girls' schools in Maharashtra
Schools in Colonial India
Educational institutions established in 1888
1888 establishments in India